Who Do You Think You Are is the third studio album by Canadian band Dala. It was released on August 14, 2007.  The band toured Canada promoting the album and opening for Matthew Good during the Nothing to Hide tour.

Track listing

Personnel
 Sheila Carabine - lead and background vocals, acoustic guitar, piano, keyboards
 Amanda Walther - lead and background vocals, acoustic guitar, piano, harmonica, keyboards
 Mike Roth - acoustic guitar, electric guitar, keyboards, percussion, producer, engineer
 Dan Roth - electric guitar(tk 3,4,10), bass (tk 2,5)
 Adrian Vanelli - drums and percussion
 Michael Carabine - electric and acoustic guitars
 Kevin Fox - cello
 Adrian Walther - bass
 Andrew Rozalowzky - bass (tk 7)
 Maria Jocobsson - harp
 Gary Craig - drums and percussion(tk 8)
 Bill Bell - guitars(tk 8)
 Tawgs Salter - bass, percussion, guitar(tk 9)
 Jason Chapman - keyboards(tk 5)
 Tim Walther - tambourine
 Andrew Carabine - pan flute

Reception
Who Do You Think You Are was released to critical acclaim.

References

External links

2007 albums
Dala (band) albums